Bhargavaea beijingensis  is a Gram-positive, non-spore-forming, rod-shaped and non-motile bacterium from the genus of Bhargavaea which has been isolated from deep-sea sediments from the Chagos-Laccadive Ridge from the Indian Ocean.

References

External links
Type strain of Bhargavaea cecembensis at BacDive -  the Bacterial Diversity Metadatabase	

Bacillales
Bacteria described in 2009